Gorrell is a surname. Notable people with the surname include:

Aaron Gorrell (born 1981), American rugby league footballer
Ashley Gorrell, American actress
Edgar S. Gorrell (1891—1945), American military officer and businessman
Frank Gorrell (1927-1994), American politician
Henry Tilton Gorrell (1911–1958), American war correspondent
Miles Gorrell (born 1955), Canadian football league player
Stuart Gorrell (1901–1963), American singer-songwriter